Erratzu is a village located in the municipality of Baztan, Navarre, Spain.

It lies on the NA-2600 which runs a few kilometres east to the border with France at Izpegi Pass.

References 

Populated places in Navarre